Manzanares Club de Fútbol is a football team based in Manzanares, Castile-La Mancha, Spain. Founded in 1949, the team plays in Tercera División Group 18. The club's home ground is the José Camacho.

Season to season

19 seasons in Tercera División (4 seasons in tier 3)

External links
Official Manzanares CF website 
Futbolme team profile 
Estadios de Espana 
Manzanares CF in English 

Football clubs in Castilla–La Mancha
Association football clubs established in 1949
1949 establishments in Spain
Province of Ciudad Real